Akame ga Kill! is an anime television series adapted from the manga series of the same title by Takahiro and Tetsuya Tashiro. The story focuses on Tatsumi, a young villager who travels to the Capital to raise money for his home, only to discover a strong corruption in the area. The assassin group known as Night Raid recruits the young man to help them in their fight against the corruption of the Empire. He quickly finds out how corrupted the Capital really is.

Produced by White Fox and directed by Tomoki Kobayashi, it was broadcast in Japan on the Tokyo MX network from July 7, 2014 to December 15, 2014. The anime primarily adapts the first eight volumes of the manga, while the last five episodes feature a completely original, self-contained story arc giving insight to Night Raid's efforts to destroy the Empire, which resulted in it having a different ending to that of the manga. In July 2014, Sentai Filmworks licensed the series for an English release in North America, while Crunchyroll streamed the series in their official website. The episodes were collected on eight DVD and Blu-ray volumes from October 15, 2014 to May 20, 2015. The series aired on Adult Swim's Toonami programming block from August 9, 2015 to February 21, 2016.

The background music was composed by Taku Iwasaki. Four pieces of theme music are used for the series. The first opening theme song is "Skyreach" performed by Akame's voice actress Sora Amamiya. The second opening theme song is "Liar Mask" performed by Rika Mayama. The second ending theme is  performed by Amamiya.


Episode list

Original net animations
The ONA series is produced by C-Station with cooperation by White Fox and are directed by Masafumi Tamura with character designs by Asami Watanabe.

Home media release

Japanese

English

See also
List of Akame ga Kill! chapters
List of Akame ga Kill! characters

Notes

References

Akame ga Kill!